Fixer Upper is an American reality television series airing on HGTV starring Chip and Joanna Gaines, based in Waco, Texas.

Series overview

Episodes

Season 1 (2013–14)

Season 2 (2015)

Season 3 (2015–16)

Season 4 (2016–17)

Season 5 (2017–18)

References

Fixer Upper